Jukwaa, also known as Dwokwaa, is a town in the Central Region of Ghana. It is the traditional capital of the people of Denkyira and is located in the Twifo-Ati Mokwa District in the Central Region. The Jukwa Senior High School is found in this town.

Places to visit
Jukwaa Cultural Village

Populated places in the Central Region (Ghana)